North Harrison Township is one of twenty current townships in Boone County, Arkansas, USA. As of the 2010 census, its total population was 8,057.

Although the township includes a significant portion of the city of Harrison, it also encompasses rural areas.  Prior to 1950, this township, along with South Harrison Township, were part of a single Harrison Township.  Boundary lines may have been different between the former single Harrison Township and the two modern day townships.

Geography

Cities, towns, and villages
Harrison (part)

Population history
The population history includes the population of that portion of the city of Harrison which is included within the boundaries of this township.

References
 United States Census Bureau 2008 TIGER/Line Shapefiles
 United States Board on Geographic Names (GNIS)
 United States National Atlas

 Census 2010 U.S. Gazetteer Files: County Subdivisions in Arkansas

External links
 US-Counties.com
 City-Data.com

Townships in Boone County, Arkansas
Townships in Arkansas